William Nathaniel Massey (3 June 1809 – 25 October 1881) was a British barrister, author and Liberal Member of Parliament.

Early life
Massey studied law, being admitted as a student at the Inner Temple in November 1826, and was called to the bar in January 1844. He married firstly in 1833, Frances Carleton, daughter of Rev John Orde.  Massey practised on the Western Circuit and in 1852 was appointed recorder of Portsmouth and in 1855 of Plymouth.

In politics
He first entered the House of Commons in July 1852 as a Liberal member for Newport, Isle of Wight. In April 1857 he became MP for Salford. In August 1855 he was appointed Under-Secretary of State for the Home Department during the first ministry of Lord Palmerston, and became a member of Brooks's. He held the office until March 1858 when the Conservatives came to power, and Lord Derby formed his second government.  He continued to represent Salford in the Commons until 1865, and was appointed Chairman of Committees of the Whole House. He purchased the old ruined estate at Old Basing House, Hampshire.

In January 1865 Massey left parliament to become a member of the Council of the Governor-General of India. He was nominated to the position of Minister for Finance in the British Raj, and was sworn onto the Privy Council. He retired from the council in 1868. 
As a "City Liberal" club member, Massey contested the constituency of Liverpool on 17 November 1868.  He was finally returned to parliament in November 1872 as MP for Tiverton, a seat he held until his death.

Later life
In 1869 Massey became chairman of the National Bank (later part of the Royal Bank of Scotland), a post he held for the rest of his life. He was a member of the Athenaeum Club; and was chairman of St John's Hospital for Diseases of the Skin. He died at his London home, 96 Portland Place, in October 1881.

Works
Massey's major work was A History of England under George III, which was published in four volumes between 1855 and 1863, by J. W. Parker & Son. It was unfinished, and drew on research of Edward Hawke Locker on George II. He also wrote:

Common Sense versus Common Law. London, Longman, Brown, Green, and Longmans, 1850.

Family
His first wife was Frances Carleton Orde (3 November 1806 – 11 July 1872) daughter of John Orde and Frances Carleton, and their son was Charles Carleton Massey (23 December 1838 –29 March 1905), the famous writer on spiritualism, psychic phenomena, mysticism and theosophy.

In 1880, shortly before his last illness, Massey married Helen Henrietta, youngest daughter of the late Patrick Grant, Esq., Sheriff-Clerk of Inverness.

References

External links 
 

1809 births
1881 deaths
Members of the Privy Council of the United Kingdom
Liberal Party (UK) MPs for English constituencies
UK MPs 1852–1857
UK MPs 1857–1859
UK MPs 1859–1865
UK MPs 1868–1874
UK MPs 1874–1880
UK MPs 1880–1885
Members of the Council of India
Members of the Inner Temple
Members of the Parliament of the United Kingdom for Salford
Members of Parliament for Newport (Isle of Wight)